Justicia clausseniana is a flowering perennial plant in the family Acanthaceae. It is native to the Atlantic Forest ecoregions of eastern Brazil.

See also
 List of plants of Atlantic Forest vegetation of Brazil
 Ecoregions of the Atlantic Forest biome

clausseniana
Endemic flora of Brazil
Flora of the Atlantic Forest